Trabia (Sicilian: 'A Trabbìa) is a comune (municipality) in the Metropolitan City of Palermo in the Italian region Sicily, located about  southeast of Palermo.

Trabia borders the following municipalities: Altavilla Milicia, Caccamo, Casteldaccia, Termini Imerese.

References

External links 
 Official website
 Trabia 1891 Death Index

Municipalities of the Metropolitan City of Palermo